Nickanan Night (sometimes called Hall Monday or Peasen Monday) is a Cornish feast, traditionally held during Shrovetide, specifically on the Monday before Lent.

Sometimes called roguery night in West Cornwall, England, UK, this event was an excuse for local youths to undertake acts of minor vandalism and play practical jokes on neighbours and family.  The name Nickanan may come from the practice of knocking on doors and running away which is known as Nicky nicky nine doors in some parts of the English-speaking world. The eating of pea soup and salt bacon was also associated with this date.

19th century description
In the 19th century Thomas Quiller Couch described Nickanan Night:

Traditional rhymes
The following rhyme was used by the Cornish children during the evening and the following day Shrove Tuesday:

In St Ives, this was:

Trigg meat
In coastal communities it was also traditional to gather shell fish such as limpets, mussels and winkles.  This practice was known as 'going a triggin' and the produce gathered known as 'trigg meat'. This is still practised at Easter by people living close to the Helford River.

Jack o' Lent
During this 'Nickanan' period another custom prevailed throughout Cornwall. In some villages it was usual to make a 'Jack o' Lent' a straw figure dressed not unlike a Guy Fawkes Night guy. This Jack-o-Lent was paraded through local communities and  pelted with projectiles and then burned on a Bonfire. This practice was until the late 19th century common in Polperro. Fire rituals such as those associated with the Jack-O-Lent may also indicate Celtic pagan origins and may be closely related to the Imbolc festival.

Hurling
The popularity of Cornish Hurling during the 'Nickanan' season indicates similarity to St Ives feast and other festivities near Candlemas. The 'Hurling of the silver ball' at St Columb Major still occurs during the run up to Lent.

See also

 Chewidden Thursday
 Tom Bawcock's Eve
 Picrous Day
 Golowan

References

February observances
Cornish culture
Carnivals in the United Kingdom
Unofficial observances
Festivals in Cornwall
Lent
Cornish festivals
Holidays based on the date of Easter